The IMOCA 60 Class yacht Charal was designed by VPLP Design Office in partnership with Gurit for the structural design. The boat was launched on the 20th August 2018 after being assembled by CDK Technologies based Port La Forêt, Lorient in France. 

The boat was very much a multinational project with hull mould constructed by SRG in Spain, and the deck mould Green Marine in United Kingdom. The one design element of the class keel was mandated from (AMPM) and the mast mandatory mast manufacturer of (Lorima).

Racing results

References 

Individual sailing yachts
2010s sailing yachts
Sailing yachts designed by VPLP
Sailboat types built by CDK Technologies
Vendée Globe boats
IMOCA 60